Lineostriastiria biundulalis is a moth of the family Noctuidae. It is found in North America, where it has been recorded from Arizona, Oklahoma and Texas.

The wingspan is about 24 mm. The fore- and hindwings are cream white with black antemedial and postmedial lines. Adults have been recorded on wing in May and from September to October in two generations per year.

References

Moths described in 1872
Noctuidae